The South Eifel refers to that part of the Eifel mountain region around the Bitburg-Prüm district in the German state of Rhineland-Palatinate.

It is bordered to the south and southeast by the river Moselle, to the northwest by the Schnee Eifel and the northeast by the Volcanic Eifel.

The cross-border German-Luxembourg Nature Park lies within the South Eifel. In the village of Bollendorf is the South Eifel Youth Hostel.

See also 

Eifel
North Eifel
West Eifel
East Eifel
Schnee Eifel
Schneifel
Rur Eifel
Volcanic Eifel

References 

Landscapes of Rhineland-Palatinate
Regions of the Eifel